Park Hee-sang (born ) is a former South Korean male volleyball player. He was part of the South Korea men's national volleyball team. He played for Inha University. He competed with the national team at the 2000 Summer Olympics in Sydney, Australia, finishing 9th.

Clubs
 Inha University (1994)
 Korean Air (1996–2003)

See also
 South Korea at the 2000 Summer Olympics

References

External links
 

1972 births
Living people
South Korean men's volleyball players
Sportspeople from Incheon
Volleyball players at the 1996 Summer Olympics
Volleyball players at the 2000 Summer Olympics
Olympic volleyball players of South Korea
Asian Games medalists in volleyball
Volleyball players at the 1994 Asian Games
Volleyball players at the 1998 Asian Games
Asian Games silver medalists for South Korea
Asian Games bronze medalists for South Korea
Medalists at the 1994 Asian Games
Medalists at the 1998 Asian Games
20th-century South Korean people